Field Marshal Thomas Grosvenor (30 May 1764 – 20 January 1851) was a British Army officer. After serving as a junior officer defending the Bank of England during the Gordon Riots he took part in the Flanders Campaign including the retreat into Germany during the French Revolutionary Wars. He served as a brigade commander at the Battle of Copenhagen and was then deployed to Walcheren in the Netherlands where he served as deputy commander of a division led by Sir Eyre Coote during the disastrous Walcheren Campaign.

Military career

Early career
Born the third son of Thomas Grosvenor (1734–1795) and Deborah (née Skynner) Grosvenor, he was educated at Westminster School and commissioned into the 1st Foot Guards on 1 October 1779. 

He was in charge of security at the Bank of England during the Gordon Riots in 1780. Promoted to captain on 20 April 1784 and lieutenant-colonel on 25 April 1793, he took part in the Flanders Campaign including the retreat into Germany in Spring 1795 during the French Revolutionary Wars.

Grosvenor succeeded his father as Whig Member of Parliament for Chester in 1795. 

He took part in the Anglo-Russian invasion of Holland in August 1799 and was promoted to brigadier-general while serving under Sir Ralph Abercromby in Holland on 18 November 1800. In parliament he opposed the bill against bull-baiting introduced in 1802. 

Promoted to major-general on 29 April 1802, Grosvenor held various brigade commands in Southern England between 1803 and 1805. He had a keen interest in horse racing and his horse, Briseis, won The Oaks in June 1807.

The Walcheren campaign
Grosvenor served as a brigade commander at the Battle of Copenhagen in August 1807 for which he was rewarded with promotion to lieutenant-general on 25 April 1808. However, in Autumn 1809 he was deployed to Walcheren in the Netherlands where he served as deputy commander of a division led by Eyre Coote during the disastrous Walcheren Campaign which ended in failure when many of the British troops died of malaria. 

In January 1810, he spoke in Parliament in support of Lord Porchester's demands for an inquiry into the disastrous expedition that had taken place the previous year and with which Grosvenor had been so closely associated.

Later career
Grosvenor was promoted to full general on 12 August 1819. In 1820 he had a fortunate escape during the Cato Street Conspiracy when an angry mob overturned his carriage into the River Dee. Around the same time he started renting the Warren House in Loughton, probably as it was on the way to Newmarket Racecourse. He stood down as Member of Parliament for Chester in 1826 to make way for his cousin's son, Robert Grosvenor, and instead became Member of Parliament for Stockbridge. In June 1825 another of Thomas Grosvenor's horses, Wings, won the Epsom Oakes. He retired from parliament in 1830.

Grosvenor also served as honorary colonel of the 97th Regiment of Foot in 1807 and then as honorary colonel of the 65th Regiment of Foot from 1814 to his death. He was promoted to field marshal on 9 November 1846 and died at his home, Mount Ararat at Richmond Hill on 20 June 1851.

Family
In 1797 Grosvenor married Elizabeth Heathcote (daughter of Sir Gilbert Heathcote, 3rd Baronet); after the death of his first wife he married Anne Wilbraham (daughter of George Wilbraham MP) in 1831. There were no children from either marriage.

References

Sources

External links 
 

|-

|-

1764 births
1851 deaths
People educated at Westminster School, London
British field marshals
Grenadier Guards officers
Thomas
British Army personnel of the French Revolutionary Wars
British Army personnel of the Napoleonic Wars
Members of the Parliament of Great Britain for English constituencies
British MPs 1796–1800
Members of the Parliament of the United Kingdom for English constituencies
UK MPs 1801–1802
UK MPs 1802–1806
UK MPs 1806–1807
UK MPs 1807–1812
UK MPs 1812–1818
UK MPs 1818–1820
UK MPs 1820–1826
UK MPs 1826–1830
65th Regiment of Foot officers